Anji railway station is a railway station in Anji County, Huzhou, Zhejiang, China. The station has one side platform, one island platform, and two through tracks without platform faces.

The station opened with the Hefei-Huzhou section of the Shangqiu–Hangzhou high-speed railway on 28 June 2020.

References 

Railway stations in Zhejiang
Railway stations in China opened in 2020